Jūrmalas pilsētas stadions "Sloka", commonly referred to as Slokas Stadions, is a multi-purpose stadium in the coastal city of Jūrmala, in northwestern Latvia.

The stadium holds 2,500 people.

Uses
It is currently used mostly for association football matches, and is the home stadium of FK Spartaks Jūrmala.

References

Jūrmala
Football venues in Latvia
Multi-purpose stadiums in Latvia
Sport in Jūrmala